Eremosphodrus is a genus of ground beetles in the family Carabidae. There are at least two described species in Eremosphodrus.

Species
These two species belong to the genus Eremosphodrus:
 Eremosphodrus dvorshaki Casale & Vereschagina, 1986  (Kazakhstan, Tadzhikistan, Turkmenistan, and Uzbekistan)
 Eremosphodrus rotundicollis (Reitter, 1894)  (Afghanistan, Tadzhikistan, Turkmenistan, and Uzbekistan)

References

Platyninae